Live at Innercity: Amsterdam RAI is a compilation album by Tiësto.

The CD came with a free VHS, which contains live footage of the Innercity party in Amsterdam.

Track listing
 Push – "Universal Nation [Live At Club Illusion]" — 6:17
 Fire & Ice – "Out Of Darkness" — 4:49
 Agnelli & Nelson – "El Nino" — 3:55
 Kamaya Painters – "Endless Wave" — 4:08
 Systematic Parts – "Deja-Vu" — 3:42
 Stray Dog – "Mirror" — 4:53
 Loop Control – "Reflections" — 5:12
 Orbital Velocity – "Last Voyage" [Club Mix] — 3:28
 Lord Of Tranz Featuring DJ Hoxider – "Sanctificum" — 4:33
 Yves Deruyter – "Feel Free" — 5:06
 Plastic Boy – "Twixt" — 5:26
 DJ Tiësto – "Theme from Norefjell" [DJ Jan & Christophe Chantzis Mix] — 3:24
 Evolver – "Evolver" [Wavestate Instrumental Mix] — 3:41
 Ralph Fridge – "Paradise" [Nu Gray Mix] — 4:09
 Gouryella – "Gouryella" — 4:45
 Cygnus X – "The Orange Theme" [Moonman's Orange Juice Mix] — 5:49

Tiësto compilation albums
1999 compilation albums
1999 live albums
1999 video albums
Live video albums